Gachon University is an academic institute located in South Korea. The current structure of Gachon university is the result of a merger between four existing universities. Gachon University of Medicine and Science and Gachon-gil College merged in 2007, Kyungwon University and Kyungwon College merged in 2007, and Gachon University of Medicine and Science and Kyungwon University merged in 2012. Gachon University has three campuses for undergraduates, the Global Campus (primary) located in Seongnam, satellite campuses on Ganghwa Island and in Yeonsu-dong, and the School of Medicine in Guwol-dong, Namdong-gu, Incheon, South Korea. Gachon University signed a strategic partnership with Hawaii Pacific to allow students to study abroad.

Colleges (Global Campus & Medical Campus) 
 College of Humanities  	
Dept. of Korean Language & Literature
Dept. of Chinese Language & Literature
Dept. of English Language & Literature
Dept. of German Language & Literature
Dept. of French Language & Literature
Dept. of Japanese Language & Literature

 College of Business & Economics	  	
Dept. of Business Administration
Dept. of Accounting & Taxation
Dept. of Economics
Dept. of International Trade & Commerce
Dept. of Tourism Management
Dept. of Healthcare Management
Dept. of Applied Statistics
Dept. of Mass Communication 
Dept. of Global Business Administration Track

 College of Law	  	
Dept. of Law
Dept. of Public Administration

 College of Engineering	  	
Dept. of Urban Planning
Dept. of Landscape Architecture
Dept. of Architecture
Dept. of Architectural Engineering
Dept. of Interior Architecture
Dept. of Electrical Engineering
Dept. of Fire & Disaster Protection Engineering
Dept. of Chemical & Biological Engineering
Dept. of Environmental & Energy Engineering
Dept. of Food Science & Biotechnology
Dept. of Building Equipment & System Engineering
Dept. of Mechanical & Automotive Engineering
Dept. of Civil & Environment Engineering
Dept.of Industrial Engineering

 College of BioNano Technology	  	
Bio-medical Major
Nano Systems Major
Dept. of Life Sciences

 College of Natural Science	  	
Dept. of Mathematics & Information
Dept. of Physics
Dept. of Chemistry
Dept. of Life Sciences

 College of Information Technology	  	
Dept. of Software Design & Management
Dept. of Computer Engineering
Dept. of Interactive Media
Dept. of Electronic Engineering
Dept. of Information & Telecommunication Engineering
Dept. of Energy & Information Technology

 College of Oriental Medicine	  	
Oriental Medicine

 College of Arts & Design	  	
Dept. of Fine Arts
Dept. of Sculpture
Dept. of Fiber Art
Dept. of Visual Design
Dept. of Industrial Design

 School of Music	  	
Dept. of Voice
Dept. of String & Wood Instruments
Dept. of Piano
Dept. of Composition

 College of Human Ecology	  	
Dept. of Clothing
Dept. of Child & Social Studies
Dept. of Food & Nutrition
Dept. of Sports & Leisure Studies
Dept. of Taekwondo Studies
Dept. of Early Childhood Education
Dept. of Acting Art

 College of Global General Education
College of Global General Education

 College of Nursing	
Division of Nursing

 College of Medical Science
Dept. of Dental Hygiene
Dept. of Emergency Medical Technology
Dept. of Radiology
Dept. of Physical Therapy
Dept. of Medical Engineering
Dept. of Health Administration

History

Established 
In 1982, Kyungwon University, a four-year college, was established with the foundation of Kyungwon Academy established in 1978. In October 1987, Kyungwon University was promoted to a university with 6 colleges. In November of the same year, Kyungwon University established a general graduate school, followed by a graduate school of education and a graduate school of government and a doctoral program.

Progress 
In 1989, the Oriental Medicine Department was newly established at Kyungwon University. In December 1992, the Seoul Oriental Hospital was opened in Songpa-gu, Seoul.

In 1990, the College of Science and Technology was separated into the College of Science (now the College of Natural Science) and the College of Engineering.

In 1992, the College of Art was separated into the College of Art (now Art Design College) and the College of Music.

In 1998, Kyungwon University, which suffered from management difficulties, was taken over by the Gachon Gil Foundation. In 2000, the Gachon Gil Foundation's Chairman Lee Gil-in took office.

In 1998, Kyungwon University was selected as the best university in all areas in the comprehensive evaluation of the university and the best university in the evaluation of educational reform. In 2001, Kyungwon University established the first software university in Korea and the only college of Oriental medicine was established in Gyeonggi Province. With the efforts of internationalization, Kyungwon University has entered into an exchange agreement with many famous universities abroad. (Harvard University, New York State University, Boston University, Duke University, Michigan State University, George Mason University and Tsinghua University in China, Oxford University in England, Ritsumeikan University in Japan Etc)

In 2011, the university signed an agreement with Hawaii Pacific University allowing Gachon students to study at HPU.

Reputation and rankings
Gachon University was ranked 30th among Korean universities and 852nd in the world by Center for World University Rankings for the 2018-2019 period.

Notable alumni
 Byun Jung-soo, actress and model
 Han Jung-soo, actor
 Kim Dong-hee, actor
 Ryu Jin, actor

References

External links 
 Gachon University - official website in english
 Gachon Gil Hospital - official website in english

Universities and colleges in Gyeonggi Province
Gachon University
Educational institutions established in 1939
1939 establishments in Korea